"Geto Heaven Remix T.S.O.I. (The Sound of Illadelph)" is the third single from rapper Common's 2000 album Like Water for Chocolate. It features Macy Gray and was produced by Questlove and James Poyser, both of whom are members of the Soulquarians. Its title is a reference to MFSB's 1974 "TSOP (The Sound of Philadelphia)"; it contains positive lyrics that are pro-woman and slightly religious. It is featured on the alternate release of Like Water for Chocolate, but on the original pressing, a song named "Geto Heaven Part 2" is found instead. "Geto Heaven Part 2" features D'Angelo and was originally intended to be on the latter's 2000 album Voodoo. The remix reached number sixty-one on the Hot R&B/Hip-Hop Songs chart. A music video directed by Nzingha Stewart was made for the remix.

Track listings and formats
CD single
"Geto Heaven Remix T.S.O.I. (The Sound of Illadelph)" (Radio Edit)
"Geto Heaven Remix T.S.O.I. (The Sound of Illadelph)" (Extended Mix)
"Geto Heaven Remix T.S.O.I. (The Sound of Illadelph)" (Brooklyn Funk Remix)
"Geto Heaven Remix T.S.O.I. (The Sound of Illadelph)" (Video)

12" single
Side A:
"Geto Heaven Remix T.S.O.I. (The Sound of Illadelph)" (Extended Radio Edit) – 4:21
"Geto Heaven Remix T.S.O.I. (The Sound of Illadelph)" (Radio Edit) – 4:02

Side B:
"Geto Heaven Remix T.S.O.I. (The Sound of Illadelph)" (Instrumental) – 5:24
"Geto Heaven Remix T.S.O.I. (The Sound of Illadelph)" (Acappella) – 5:26

Charts

References

See also
List of Common songs

2001 singles
Common (rapper) songs
Macy Gray songs
Songs written by James Poyser
Songs written by Common (rapper)
2000 songs
MCA Records singles